Chandlers Chapel is an unincorporated community located in Logan County, Kentucky, United States.

The David Sawyer House, built in 1814 near Chandlers Chapel, has been listed on the National Register of Historic Places.

The area was impacted by an EF3 tornado just after midnight on December 11, 2021, with the Methodist Church and several homes being heavily damaged.

References

Unincorporated communities in Logan County, Kentucky
Unincorporated communities in Kentucky